Ogechi Ogwudu  is a Nigerian taekwondo practitioner. She won a bronze medal at the 2009 African Taekwondo Championships in the –57 kg category.

International honors

References 

Year of birth missing (living people)
Living people
Nigerian female taekwondo practitioners
21st-century Nigerian women